The Federation of Drama Schools functions to facilitate vocational drama training in the UK. It was formed in June 2017.

History
A formal organisation for drama training in the UK was first established with the Conference of Drama Schools (CDS) in 1969. This was followed by the National Council for Drama Training in 1976, which was primarily responsible for accrediting courses offered by the Conference of Drama Schools. In July 2012 both national organisations were merged to form a single regulatory body called Drama UK. The Federation of Drama Schools was formed on 13 June 2017 following the abolition of Drama UK in 2016 after a period of instability in which several high-profile schools quit the organisation. Unlike its predecessor, the membership body will not provide independent accreditation for schools, but all members commit to adhering to a set of 'guiding hallmarks'.

Members
Includes:
 Bristol Old Vic Theatre School
 Drama Studio London 
 East 15 Acting School (E15)
 Guildford School of Acting (GSA)
 Guildhall School of Music and Drama
 Italia Conti Academy of Theatre Arts
 London Academy of Music and Dramatic Art (LAMDA)
 Liverpool Institute for Performing Arts (LIPA)
 Manchester School of Theatre
 Mountview Academy of Theatre Arts
 Oxford School of Drama
 Rose Bruford College
 Royal Academy of Dramatic Art (RADA)
 Royal Central School of Speech and Drama (RCSSD, formerly CSSD)
 Royal Conservatoire of Scotland (RCS, formerly RSAMD)
 Royal Welsh College of Music & Drama (RWCMD)

See also
 Conference of Drama Schools
 Drama UK
 National Council for Drama Training

References

External links
 http://www.federationofdramaschools.co.uk/

Drama schools in the United Kingdom
2017 establishments in the United Kingdom
Higher education organisations based in the United Kingdom
Organizations established in 2017
Theatre in the United Kingdom